Aranza Valentina Villalón Sánchez (born 16 June 1995) is a Chilean professional racing cyclist, who rides for UCI Women's Continental Team .

Major results

2015
 5th 9 de Julho
 7th Overall Armed Forces Association Cycling Classic
2016
 National Road Championships
1st  Time trial
6th Road race
 1st Overall Vuelta a la Prov. de Buenos Aires
1st Stage 1
 7th Gran Premio de Venezuela
 8th Grand Prix de Venezuela
 9th Overall Tour Femenino de San Luis
1st  Young rider classification
2017
 Bolivarian Games
1st  Time trial
7th Road race
 1st  Time trial, National Road Championships
 1st Overall Vuelta de La Pampa
1st Stages 1, 2 (ITT) & 3
 2nd Overall Tour Internacional Femenino de Uruguay
1st Stage 3 (ITT)
 5th Time trial, Pan American Road Championships
2018
 National Road Championships
1st  Road race
1st  Time trial
 1st Overall Vuelta Femenina a San Juan
1st Stages 1, 2 (ITT) & 3
 5th Time trial, Pan American Road Championships
 South American Games
5th Time trial
8th Road race
2019
 1st Overall Vuelta a Colombia Femenina
1st Stage 4 (ITT)
 1st Overall Vuelta Femenino del Porvenir
1st Stage 4 (ITT)
 National Road Championships
2nd Road race
3rd Time trial
 2nd Overall Vuelta Antioquia Femenina
1st Stages 1, 2 & 3
 8th Overall Vuelta Femenina a Guatemala
 9th Time trial, Pan American Games
2021
 National Road Championships
1st  Road race
1st  Time trial
 2nd Overall Vuelta a Colombia Femenina
1st Stage 2
 3rd  Team pursuit, Pan American Track Championships
 3rd  Time trial, Pan American Road Championships
2022
 3rd Time trial, National Road Championships
 1st Overall Vuelta a Formosa Femenina
 1st Stage 3a (ITT)

See also
 List of 2015 UCI Women's Teams and riders

References

External links
 
 

1995 births
Living people
Chilean female cyclists
Sportspeople from Santiago
Cyclists at the 2019 Pan American Games
Pan American Games competitors for Chile
20th-century Chilean women
21st-century Chilean women